I'm Only a Woman is a studio album by American country music artist Dottie West. It was released in May 1972 on RCA Victor Records and was produced by Jerry Bradley. The project was West's nineteenth studio album. Among the album's ten tracks were two charting singles issued between 1971 and 1972. It was West's only studio release issued in 1972 and third studio album not receive a Billboard chart placement.

Background and content
I'm Only a Woman was recorded at RCA Studio B, a venue located in Nashville, Tennessee. The album sessions were produced by Jerry Bradley. It was West's fifth time collaborating with Bradley on an album project. The collection consisted of ten tracks.

Two of the album's songs were cover versions of songs first recorded by others. The song, "Are You Lonesome Tonight", was made popular first in the 1920s and later in the 1960s by Elvis Presley. "Together Again" was composed and made a hit by Buck Owens in the 1960s as well. The album also included original tracks. However, unlike West's previous album releases I'm Only a Woman did not include a self-composed material. For the album, Bradley and West chose well-known Nashville songwriters to pen material. The project included writing by Kris Kristofferson, Ben Peters and Billy Sherrill.

Release and reception
I'm Only a Woman was released in May 1972 on RCA Victor Records and was her nineteenth studio album. It was her only record released in that year. It was issued as a vinyl LP, consisting of five songs on each side of the original record. I'm Only a Woman was West's third record in a row to miss charting on the Billboard album surveys, most notably the Top Country Albums chart.

The release accounted for two singles released between 1971 and 1972. Both singles only became minor hits, according to Billboard. The first to be released was "Lonely Is" in May 1971. Spending eight weeks charting, the single peaked at number 53 on the Hot Country Singles list by July. The title track was released in April 1972. It spent a total of nine weeks on the country songs chart before reaching number 52 in July.

Track listing

Personnel
All credits are adapted from the liner notes of I'm Only a Woman.

Musical personnel

 Byron Bach – cello
 Brenton Banks – violin
 George Binkley – violin
 Harold Bradley – guitar
 David Briggs – harpsichord, piano
 Marvin Chantry – viola
 Albert Coleman – violin
 Pete Drake – steel guitar
 Ray Edenton – guitar
 Lillian Hunt – violin
 The Jordanaires – background vocals
 Martin Katahn – violin

 Sheldon Kurland – violin
 Grady Martin – guitar
 Charlie McCoy – harmonica, vibes
 Snuffy Miller – drums
 Bob Moore – bass
 Hargus "Pig" Robbins – piano
 Jerry Shook – guitar
 Gary Vanosdale – viola
 Bill West – steel guitar
 Dottie West – lead vocals
 Gary Williams – cello
 Chip Young – guitar

Technical personnel
 Ray Butts – recording technician
 Jerry Bradley – producer
 Dick Cobb – cover photo
 Leslie Ladd – engineering
 Al Pachucki – engineering
 Tom Pick – engineering
 David Roys – recording technician
 Mike Shockley – recording technician
 Roy Shockley – recording technician
 Bill Vandevort – engineering

Release history

References

1971 albums
Albums produced by Jerry Bradley (music executive)
Dottie West albums
RCA Records albums